The 1986–87 Marist Red Foxes men's basketball team represented Marist College in the 1986–87 NCAA Division I men's basketball season. The Red Foxes, led by first-year head coach Dave Magarity, played their home games at the James J. McCann Recreation Center in Poughkeepsie, New York as members of the ECAC Metro Conference. They finished the season 20–11, 15–1 in ECACM play, finishing in first place and winning the ECAC regular season championship. As the No. 1 seed in the ECAC tournament, they advanced to the championship game, where they defeated second-seeded Fairleigh Dickinson 64–55 in overtime to win the school's second consecutive ECAC Metro men's basketball tournament title. The Red Foxes earned the automatic bid to the 1986 NCAA tournament, receiving a 14 seed in the West region. They were defeated in the first round 68–93 by No. 12 Pittsburgh.

Coaching change
In May 1986, several Marist players met with senior college administrators to discuss their complaints about the handling of the team by head coach Matthew Furjanic Jr. Several of them indicated they would not return for the 1986–87 if Furjanic, who had one year left on his contract, remained as head coach. Furjanic took over for Marist in the fall of 1984 after the forced resignation of 5-month term coach Mike Perry, who admitted committing violations of NCAA rules by offering extra benefits to a player to mask allegations and complaints of sexual advances towards the prospective recruit. Furjanic would step down a couple weeks later, citing personal reasons. On June 10, 1986, Marist hired former Saint Francis (PA) head coach Dave Magarity to replace him.

NCAA Penalties
While the NCAA was investigating the self reported violations of 1984, 2 days before the 1986–87 season was to begin, the NCAA declared Rik Smits, Miroslav Pecarski, and Rudy Bourgarel ineligible because the NCAA said that Mike Perry illegally recruited them for Marist. The NCAA Council's subcommittee on eligibility issued a decision that Pecarski and Bourgarel's violations were minor, and their suspensions would last seven games, although stats seem to indicate it was reduced to four. Smits, facing a complete season suspension, was eventually decided on nine games. Without Smits, Marist started the season 3–6, and losing the first game he returned to.

Previous season
The Red Foxes finished the 1985–86 season 19–12, 11–5 in ECACM play to finish in second place. As the No. 2 seed in the ECAC tournament, they advanced to the championship game, where they defeated top-seeded Fairleigh Dickinson 57–56 in overtime to win the school's first ECAC Metro men's basketball tournament title. The Red Foxes earned the automatic bid to the 1986 NCAA tournament, receiving a 15 seed in the Southeast region. They were defeated in the first round 53–68 by No. 6 Georgia Tech.

Roster

Schedule and results

|-
!colspan=9 style="background:#B31B1B; color:#FFFFFF;"| Regular season

|-
!colspan=9 style="background:#B31B1B; color:#FFFFFF;"|ECAC Metro tournament
|-

|-
!colspan=9 style="background:#B31B1B; color:#FFFFFF;"|NCAA tournament
|-

Source

References

Marist Red Foxes men's basketball seasons
Marist
Marist Red Foxes men's basketball
Marist Red Foxes men's basketball
Marist